Badminton at the 1997 East Asian Games was held at Busan, South Korea in the month of May. Competitions for five individual disciplines as well as for teams was conducted. Host South Korea topped with four gold medals in the tally while China won two gold medals and Chinese Taipei ended with the Men's singles gold medal.

Medal summary

Medal table

Medalists

Final results

References 

1997 in badminton
1997 in South Korean sport
Badminton in South Korea
International sports competitions hosted by South Korea
Badminton at the East Asian Games